Schmidt Hammer Lassen Architects (SHL) is an international architectural firm founded by a group of Danish architects in 1986 in Aarhus, Denmark. It currently has three offices in Copenhagen and Aarhus in Denmark, as well as Shanghai, China.

The studio has a distinguished track record as designers of international high-profile architecture, that is deeply rooted to the Nordic architectural traditions of democracy, welfare, aesthetics, light, sustainability and social responsibility. In 2018, Schmidt Hammer Lassen became part of global architecture and design firm Perkins and Will.

The practice has a track record as designers of high-profile cultural buildings; theatres; art galleries, educational complexes and libraries. Notable projects include the national library of Denmark The Royal Library (Det Kongelige Bibliotek) in Copenhagen, the ARoS Kunstmuseum in Aarhus, DOKK1, the largest public library in Scandinavia and named by IFLA International Federation of Library Associations as Public Library of the Year in 2016, and Shanghai Library East, which will become China's largest new library when it opens in 2022.

History

Schmidt Hammer Lassen Architects was established in 1986 by Morten Schmidt, Bjarne Hammer and John F. Lassen.

The current group of Principals includes Morten Schmidt, Kristian Lars Ahlmark, Chris Hardie, Elif Tinaztepe, Kasper Heiberg Frandsen, Mads Kaltoft, and Sanne Wall-Gremstrup.

The practice had its major breakthrough with the Katuaq Culture Centre in Nuuk, Greenland, completed in 1997. The project in Nuuk was followed by first prize in the international competition for the extension of the Danish Royal Library on the harborfront in Copenhagen. Completed in 1999, the library extension, also known as the Black Diamond, has become one of the practice's best known buildings.

Another major project is the ARoS Art Museum in Aarhus, Denmark, which was completed in 2004. In May 2011 the art work Your rainbow panorama, by Olafur Eliasson, was officially unveiled on the roof top of the museum.

In 2010 Schmidt Hammer Lassen Architects won the competition to design the first permanent premises for the International Criminal Court (ICC) in The Hague, the Netherlands. The ICC is the first permanent, treaty-based, international criminal court established to help end impunity for the perpetrators of the most serious crimes of concern to the international community. It was founded in 2002 and has grown to the present-day size of 122 member countries. The building is designed to convey hope, trust and faith in justice.

In 2011 Schmidt Hammer Lassen established an office in Shanghai, to serve their increasing client base in Asia. Current projects include China's largest new Library Shanghai Library East , the world's largest waste to energy power plant Shenzhen Energy Ring, both due for completion in 2022, the Ningbo New Library in Ningbo, China, completed in 2019, and the Green Heart Grand Theatre in Tongzhou, Beijing, China due for completion in 2023.

Philosophy
The common denominator underlying the practice's work is a democratic approach to an architecture focused around people, material, space, and light.

Product design
Schmidt Hammer Lassen Architects' work also include furniture and product designs, both as an integral part of large-scale architectural projects, such as the Black Diamond and ARoS, and as independent designs. Begun with the intention of raising the overall quality of architectural projects, Schmidt Hammer Lassen design is an independent department working on architecture-related designs and independent products with international manufacturers.

The current product range includes light fixtures for Philips Lighting, Lampas and Focus, indoor furniture Piiroinen and DJOB Montana, outdoor street furniture for Veksoe. Designs include the Flakes chair, the Focus Lighting, Idea Water Fixtures and the Swan Neck. The design department also creates unique pieces such as the sculptural receptions desk at Danfoss.

The firm also creates interior designs, such as the Bodil Binner Jewellery shop.

Selected works

Completed

1997
 Katuaq Culture Centre, Nuuk, Greenland (completed 1997)
1999
 Black Diamond, Danish Royal Library, Copenhagen, Denmark (completed 1999)
2001
 Nykredit Headquarters, Copenhagen, Denmark (completed 2001)
2003
 ARoS Aarhus Kunstmuseum, Aarhus, Denmark (completed 2003)
2006
 Halmstad Library, Halmstad, Sweden (completed 2006)
 University of Aberdeen Sir Duncan Rice Library, Aberdeen, Scotland (competition win 2006)
2007
 Performers House, Silkeborg, Denmark (completed 2007)
2009
 Scania and Blekinge Court of Appeal, Malmö, Sweden (completed 2009)
 Thor Heyerdahl College, Larvik, Norway (completed 2009)
2010
 Amazon Court, Prague, Czech Republic (2010)
2011
 City of Westminster College, Paddington Green campus London, UK (2011)
 The Crystal, Copenhagen (2011)
2013
 Cathedral of the Northern Lights, Alta, Norway (completed 2013)
2014
 Halifax Central Library, Halifax, Nova Scotia, Canada (completed 2014)
2015
 Malmö Live, Concert Hall and Conference Centre, Malmö, Sweden (competition win May 2010, completed 2015)
 International Criminal Court, The Hague, Netherlands (completed 2015)
 DOKK1 Urban Mediaspace, Aarhus, Denmark (completed June 2015)

In progress

 Ningbo Home of Staff, Ningbo, China (expected completion 2017)
 Konstitucijos Avenue 21 urban complex, Vilnius, Lithuania (competition win 2009)
 Island School, Hong Kong, China (competition win 2014)
 Ningbo New Library, Ningbo, China (expected completion 2017)
 Skanderborg Sports and Administration Centre, Skanderborg, Denmark (competition win 2013)
 Vendsyssel Theatre and Experience Centre, Vendsyssel, Denmark (competition win 2013)
 Expo Green Valley, Shanghai, China (expected completion 2016)
 Ningbo Daily Newspaper Headquarters, Ningbo, China (expected completion 2016)
 Dream Theatre, Dream Dome and Dream Hub for Dream Center, Shanghai China (expected completion 2017)
 CaoHeJing Innovation Incubator, Shanghai, China (expected completion 2016)
 Sunbird Daxi Central Park Residences, Taipei, Taiwan (expected completion 2016)
 Saltkristallerna, Helsingborg, Sweden (competition win February 2010))

 Warsaw Office Tower, Warsaw, Poland (competition win, November 2011)
 China Mobile Campus, Huaian, China (expected completion 2017)
 China Mobile Campus, Luoyang, China (expected completion 2017)
 New Aalborg University Hospital, Aalborg, Denmark (competition win, 2013)
 Cultural Center and Library, Karlshamn, Sweden (competition win, January 2013)
 Extension of Helsingborg Hospital, Helsingborg, Sweden (competition win 2013)
 Correctional facility in Nuuk, Greenland (competition win 2013)
 New Hospital Hvidovre, Hvidovre, Denmark (competition win 2013)
 Christchurch Central Library, Christchurch, New Zealand (completed mid-2018)

Awards

 1997 Nykredit Architecture Prize
 2007 MIPIM AR Future Projects Award ('residential' category) for Skytthusbugten
 2008 LEAF Award, Grand Prix for Performers House
 2008 MIPIM AR Future Projects Award ('office' category) for Amazon Court
 2009 Construction and Investment Journal Award ('Best Office Development') for Amazon Court
 2009 MIPIM AR Future Projects Award ('mixed use' category) for Holbæk Harbour Masterplan
 2011 New London Award ('learning' category) for City of Westminster College
 2011 LEAF Award ('structural design' category) for The Crystal
 2011 Aarhus Municipality Award for Villa Busk/ Vibevej 27, Denmark
 2011 The Concrete Society Awards, shortlisted for City of Westminster College, England
 2011 ArchDaily Building of the Year Award for the Crystal, Denmark
 2012 Arne of the Year Award, shortlisted for The Crystal, Denmark
 2012 RIBA Award, EU category, shortlisted for The Crystal, Denmark
 2012 Civic Society Award for University of Aberdeen New Library, UK
 2013 IABSE Denmark's Structure Award for the Crystal in Copenhagen
 2013 RIAS Award 2013 for University of Aberdeen New Library, UK
 2013 RIBA Award 2013 for University of Aberdeen New Library, UK
 2014 Lieutenant Governor's Design Award in Architecture for Halifax Central Library

References

Further reading
Marianne Ibler (2007) Global Danish Architecture #2 – Housing. Copenhagen, Denmark: Archipress
schmidt hammer lassen (1999) The Royal Library – Architectural Images. Copenhagen, Denmark: Gyldendal
Forster et al. (2005) 10x10_2. London, UK: Phaidon
schmidt hammer lassen architects (2008) Outline – architecture by schmidt hammer lassen, Birkhäuser Verlag

External links

 Official website
 Schmidt Hammer Lassen’s Denmark studio via Perkins and Will
 Schmidt Hammer Lassen’s Shanghai studio via Perkins and Will

Architecture firms of Denmark
Architecture firms based in Copenhagen
Companies based in Copenhagen
Design companies established in 1986
Danish companies established in 1986
Recipients of the Eckersberg Medal
Companies based in Copenhagen Municipality